Brett Andrew Swain (born June 21, 1985) is a former American football wide receiver. He was drafted by the Green Bay Packers in the seventh round of the 2008 NFL Draft. He won Super Bowl XLV with the Packers over the Pittsburgh Steelers. He played college football at San Diego State. He last played for the Saskatchewan Roughriders of the Canadian Football League.

Early years
Swain graduated from Carlsbad High School in Carlsbad, California. He graduated in 2003.

College career
Swain played four seasons at San Diego State. As a senior in 2007, he led his team by recording 58 receptions for 973 yards and 5 touchdowns. In 2006, he started a season for the first time and recorded 47 catches for 528 yards and scored twice. He also had 7 carries for 35 yards, though did not record a touchdown. He was an All-Mountain West Conference wide receiver his senior year.

Professional career

Green Bay Packers
Swain was drafted by the Packers in the seventh round of the 2008 NFL Draft. On July 23 it was announced that the Packers signed him to a contract. He was later cut then signed to the team's practice squad. He was re-signed to a future contract following the end of the season. He played in Super Bowl XLV in the Packers 31-25 win over the Pittsburgh Steelers.

On October 27, Swain was placed on Injured Reserve

On August 28, 2011, Swain was waived by Green Bay.

San Francisco 49ers
He signed with the San Francisco 49ers on October 11, 2011. He appeared in the playoff game when they defeated the New Orleans Saints. Swain was released on August 31, 2012 and did not play in the NFL for the 2012-2013 season.

Seattle Seahawks
On April 8, 2013 Swain signed with the Seattle Seahawks. On August 26, 2013, he was cut by the Seahawks.

Saskatchewan Roughriders
On February 27, 2014, Swain signed with the Saskatchewan Roughriders of the CFL. Swain was cut by the team on February 11, 2015.

References

External links
Green Bay Packers bio
San Diego State Aztecs bio
Saskatchewan Roughriders bio

1985 births
Living people
American football wide receivers
Canadian football wide receivers
American players of Canadian football
Green Bay Packers players
Sportspeople from Asheville, North Carolina
Sportspeople from Carlsbad, California
Players of American football from California
Players of American football from North Carolina
San Diego State Aztecs football players
San Francisco 49ers players
Seattle Seahawks players
Saskatchewan Roughriders players